MRK-016 is a selective α5 subunit-containing GABAA negative allosteric modulator, that has nootropic properties. It has been found to produce rapid, ketamine-like antidepressant effects in animal models of depression.

See also 
 GABAA receptor negative allosteric modulator
 GABAA receptor § Ligands

References 

Antidepressants
GABAA receptor negative allosteric modulators
Isoxazoles
Nootropics
Triazoles
Tert-butyl compounds